Sukjong of Joseon (7 October 1661 – 12 July 1720) was the 19th King of the Joseon Dynasty of Korea, ruling from 1674 until 1720. A skilled legislator, he caused multiple changes in political power throughout his reign, by switching among the Namin (Southerners), Seoin (Westerners), Soron and Noron political factions.

Biography 

King Sukjong was born on October 7, 1661, to King Hyeonjong and Queen Myeongseong at Gyeonghui Palace. His given name was Yi Sun. He became the Crown Prince Myeongbo in 1667 at age 6, and in 1674, at age 13, he became the 19th ruler of the Joseon Dynasty.

King Sukjong was a brilliant politician, but his reign was marked by some of the most intense factional fights in the Joseon dynasty. Sukjong frequently replaced faction in power with another one to strengthen the royal authority. With each change of government, which was called hwanguk, literally change/switching of the state, the losing faction was completely driven out of politics with executions and exiles. Nevertheless, the chaotic changes of government did not affect the general populace significantly, and his reign is considered one of more prosperous times.

Factional Fighting 
In the early years of Sukjong's reign, the Southern faction and Western faction clashed over the Royal Funeral Dispute, a seemingly minor issue regarding the mourning period for Queen Insun. The Southern faction claimed that the mourning period should last one year while the Western faction argued for a nine-month mourning period. A one-year mourning period meant that Hyojong of Joseon was considered the eldest son while 9-month period would suggest that Hyojong was considered not the eldest son, following the rules that governed the yangban class. In other words, the Western faction viewed the royal family as the first of the yangban class rather than a separate class for which different rules applied. The two factions were also in conflict over the issue of fighting the Qing Dynasty, which was considered barbaric country (as opposed to Ming Dynasty) that threatened Joseon's national security. The Southern faction, led by Heo Jeok and Yun Hyu, supported war against Qing while Western factions wanted to focus first on improving domestic conditions.

Sukjong at first sided with the Southern faction, but in 1680, Heo Jeok was accused of treason by Western faction, which led to the execution of Heo Jeok and Yun Hyu and purging of the Southern faction. This incident is called Gyeongsin hwanguk (경신환국). Once in power, the Western faction split into the Noron (Old Learning) faction, led by Song Si-yeol, and the Soron (New Learning) faction, led by Yun Jeung. After nine years in power, the Noron collapsed when Sukjong deposed Queen Min (posthumously called Queen Inhyeon), who was supported by the Western faction, and named Consort Hui of the Jang clan (also called Consort Jang or Jang Hui-bin) as the new queen. She is widely thought to be one of the most beautiful women of Joseon, her beauty mentioned in the Annals. The Western faction angered Sukjong when it opposed the naming of Consort Jang's son as crown prince. The Southern faction, who supported Consort Jang and her son, regained power and drove out Western faction, executing Song Si-yeol in revenge. This is called Gisa Hwanguk (기사환국).

Five years later in 1694, as the Southern faction planned another purge of the Western faction, accusing them of conspiracy to reinstate the deposed Queen, Sukjong began to regret deposing Queen Min and favored Consort Suk of the Choe clan, an ally of the Queen and the Noron faction. Angry with the Southern faction's attempt to purge Westerners, Sukjong abruptly turned around to purge Southerners and brought the Western faction back to power. The Southern faction would never recover from this blow, also called Gapsul Hwanguk (갑술환국). Sukjong demoted Queen Jang to her previous title (Jang Hui-bin) and reinstated Queen Min. Consort Jang was eventually executed by poison for cursing the Queen. The Soron faction supported Crown Prince Yi Yun, Consort Jang's son, while the Noron faction supported Consort Choe's son, Prince Yeoning (Yi Geum), later to become Yeongjo of Joseon. The late Queen Inhyeon and the newly installed Queen Kim (posthumously known as Queen Inwon) were both childless.

In 1718, Sukjong allowed the crown prince, soon to be Gyeongjong of Joseon, to rule as regent. Sukjong died in 1720 supposedly after telling Yi Yi-myoung to name Prince Yeoning as Gyeongjong's heir - in absence of a historiographer or recorder. This would lead to yet another purge in which four Noron leaders were executed in 1721, followed by another purge with the executions of eight Noron members in 1722.

Sukjong's accomplishments include tax reform (大同法), the creation of a new monetary system and currency (Korean mun), and the liberalization of civil service rules promoting the middle class and children of concubines into  higher-ranking regional government positions.

In 1712, Sukjong's government worked with the Qing Dynasty in China to define national borders between the two countries at the Yalu and Tumen Rivers. The Japanese government recognized Ulleung Island as Joseon's territory in 1696 (the South Korean government insists that Liancourt Rocks was also recognized, while the Japanese government disagrees).

Sukjong's reign also saw agricultural development in remote provinces and increased cultural activity including publishing. He died after reigning for 46 years in 1720 at age 60. He was buried in Myeongneung (명릉) in Goyang, Gyeonggi Province, inside the Five Western Royal Graves (서오릉, 西五陵; Seooneung).

Family 
Father: King Hyeonjong of Joseon (14 March 1641 – 17 September 1674) (조선 현종)
Grandfather: King Hyojong of Joseon (3 July 1619 – 23 June 1659) (조선 효종)
Grandmother: Queen Inseon of the Deoksu Jang clan (9 February 1619 – 19 March 1674) (인선왕후 장씨)
Mother: Queen Myeongseong of the Cheongpung Kim clan (13 June 1642 – 21 January 1684) (명성왕후 김씨)
Grandfather: Kim Woo-myeong (1619–1675) (김우명)
Grandmother: Lady Song of the Eunjin Song clan (1621–1660) (은진 송씨)
Consorts and their Respective Issue:
 Queen Ingyeong of the Gwangsan Kim clan (25 October 1661 – 16 December 1680) (인경왕후 김씨)
 First daughter (27 April 1677 – 13 March 1678)
 Second daughter (23 October 1679 – 24 October 1679)
 Unnamed child (22 July 1680); miscarriage
 Queen Inhyeon of the Yeoheung Min clan (15 May 1667 – 16 September 1701) (인현왕후 민씨) – No issue.
 Queen Inwon of the Gyeongju Kim clan (3 November 1687 – 13 May 1757) (인원왕후 김씨) – No issue.
 Royal Noble Consort Hui of the Indong Jang clan (Queen Bu-ok — between May 1688 – 1694, deposed) (3 November 1659 – 9 November 1701) (희빈 장씨)
 Crown Prince Yi Yun (20 November 1688 – 11 October 1724) (이윤), first son
 Prince Seongsu (1690 – 1690) (성수), second son
Royal Noble Consort Suk of the Haeju Choe clan (17 December 1670 – 9 April 1718) (숙빈 최씨)
 Prince Yeongsu (1693 – 1693) (영수군), third son
 Yi Geum, Prince Yeoning (31 October 1694 – 22 April 1776) (이금 연잉군), fourth son
 Fifth son (1698 – 1698)
 Royal Noble Consort Myeong of the Miryang Park clan (? – 1703) (명빈 박씨)
 Yi Hwon, Prince Yeollyeong (13 June 1699 – 2 October 1719) (이훤 연령군), sixth son
 Royal Noble Consort Yeong of the Andong Kim clan (1669–1735) (영빈 김씨) – No issue.
 Royal Consort Gwi-in of the Gyeongju Kim clan (1690–1735) (귀인 김씨) – No issue.
 Royal Consort So-ui of the Gangneung Yu clan (? – 1707) (소의 유씨) – No issue.

Ancestry 
{{ahnentafel
|collapsed=yes |align=center
|boxstyle_1=background-color: #fcc;
|boxstyle_2=background-color: #fb9;
|boxstyle_3=background-color: #ffc;
|boxstyle_4=background-color: #bfc;
| 1 = 1. 'Yi Sun , King Sukjong of Joseon
| 2 = 2. King Hyeonjong of Joseon
| 3 = 3. Queen Myeongseong of the Cheongpung Kim Clan
| 4 = 4. King Hyojong of Joseon
| 5 = 5. Queen Inseon of the Deoksu Jang Clan
| 6 = 6. Kim U-myeong
| 7 = 7. Lady Song of the Eunjin Song clan
| 8 = 8. King Injo of Joseon
| 9 = 9. Queen Inryeol of the Cheongju Han Clan
|10 = 10. Jang Yu
|11 = 11. Lady Kim of the Andong Kim clan
|12 = 12. Kim Yuk
|13 = 13. Lady Yun of the Papyeong Yun clan
|14 = 14. Song Guk-Taek
|15 = 15. Lady Kang of the Jinju Kang clan
}}

 In popular culture 
 Portrayed by Kim Jin-kyu in the 1961 film Jang Hui-bin.
 Portrayed by Shin Seong-il in the 1968 film Femme Fatale, Jang Hee-bin.
 Portrayed by Park Geun-hyung in the 1971 MBC TV series Jang Hui-bin.
 Portrayed by Park Geun-hyung in the 1981 MBC TV series Women of History: Jang Hui-bin.
 Portrayed by Kang Seok-woo in the 1988 MBC TV series 500 Years of Joseon: Queen Inhyeon.
 Portrayed by Im Ho in the 1995 SBS TV series Jang Hui-bin.
 Portrayed by Jun Kwang-ryul in the 2002 KBS TV series Jang Hui-bin.
 Portrayed by Ji Jin-hee in the 2010 MBC TV series Dong Yi.
 Portrayed by Seo Woo-jin in the 2012 tvN TV series Queen and I.
 Portrayed by Kang Han-byeol in the 2012 MBC TV series The King's Doctor.
 Portrayed by Yoo Ah-in and Chae Sang-woo in the 2013 SBS TV series Jang Ok-jung, Living by Love.
 Portrayed by Choi Min-soo in the 2016 SBS TV series Jackpot.
 Portrayed by Kim Kap-soo in the 2019 SBS TV series Haechi.

 See also 
 History of Korea
 List of monarchs of Korea
 Joseon Dynasty

 References 

 Further reading 
 Kim, Jinwung.  A History of Korea: From "Land of the Morning Calm" to States in Conflict (2002)
 Liu, Lihong. "Ethnography and Empire through an Envoy’s Eye: The Manchu Official Akedun’s (1685–1756) Diplomatic Journeys to Chosǒn Korea." Journal of early modern history'' 20.1 (2016): 111–139.

1720 deaths
1661 births
17th-century Korean monarchs
18th-century Korean monarchs